Joseph Smith Jr. (December 23, 1805June 27, 1844) was an American religious leader and the founder of Mormonism and the Latter Day Saint movement. At the age of 24, Smith published the Book of Mormon and by the time of his death, 14 years later, he had attracted tens of thousands of followers. The religion he founded continues to the present day, with millions of global adherents.

Born in Sharon, Vermont, Smith moved with his family to Western New York in 1816, following a series of crop failures. This was an area of intense religious revivalism during the Second Great Awakening, and Smith reported experiencing a series of visions. The first of these was in 1820, when he saw "two personages" (whom he eventually described as God the Father and Jesus Christ). In 1823, he said he was visited by an angel, who directed him to a buried book of golden plates inscribed with a Judeo-Christian history of an ancient American civilization. In 1830, Smith published an English translation of these plates called the Book of Mormon. The same year he organized the Church of Christ, calling it a restoration of the early Christian Church. Members of the church were later called "Latter Day Saints" or "Mormons", and in 1838, Smith announced a revelation renaming the church as The Church of Jesus Christ of Latter Day Saints.

In 1831, Smith and his followers moved west, planning to build a communal American Zion. They first gathered in Kirtland, Ohio, and established an outpost in Independence, Missouri, which was intended to be Zion's "center place". During the 1830s, Smith sent out missionaries, published revelations, and supervised construction of the Kirtland Temple. Because of the collapse of the church-sponsored Kirtland Safety Society, violent skirmishes with non-Mormon Missourians, and the Mormon extermination order, Smith and his followers established a new settlement at Nauvoo, Illinois, of which he was the spiritual and political leader. In 1844, when the Nauvoo Expositor criticized Smith's power and his practice of polygamy, Smith and the Nauvoo city council ordered the destruction of its printing press, inflaming anti-Mormon sentiment. Fearing an invasion of Nauvoo, Smith rode to Carthage, Illinois, to stand trial, but he was killed when a mob stormed the jailhouse.

During his ministry, Smith published numerous documents and texts, many of which he attributed to divine inspiration and revelation from God. He dictated the majority of these in the first-person, saying they were the writings of ancient prophets or expressed the voice of God; Smith's followers accepted his teachings as prophetic and revelatory, and several of these texts were canonized by denominations of the Latter Day Saint movement, which continue to treat them as scripture. Smith's teachings discuss God's nature, cosmology, family structures, political organization, and religious community and authority. Mormons generally regard him as a prophet comparable to Moses and Elijah. Several religious denominations identify as the continuation of the church that he organized, including the Church of Jesus Christ of Latter-day Saints (LDS Church) and the Community of Christ.

Life

Early years (1805–1827)

Smith was born on December 23, 1805, on the border between South Royalton and Sharon, Vermont, to Lucy Mack Smith and her husband Joseph Smith Sr., a merchant and farmer. He was one of 11 children. At the age of seven, Smith suffered a crippling bone infection and, after receiving surgery, used crutches for three years. After an ill-fated business venture and three successive years of crop failures culminating in the 1816 Year Without a Summer, the Smith family left Vermont and moved to Western New York, taking out a mortgage on a  farm in the townships of Palmyra and Manchester.

The region was a hotbed of religious enthusiasm during the Second Great Awakening. Between 1817 and 1825, there were several camp meetings and revivals in the Palmyra area. Smith's parents disagreed about religion, but the family was caught up in this excitement. Smith said that he had become interested in religion by age 12, and as a teenager, may have been sympathetic to Methodism. With other family members, Smith also engaged in religious folk magic, a relatively common practice in that time and place. Both his parents and his maternal grandfather reported having visions or dreams that they believed communicated messages from God. Smith said that, although he had become concerned about the welfare of his soul, he was confused by the claims of competing religious denominations.

Years later, Smith wrote that he had received a vision that resolved his religious confusion. He said that in 1820, while he had been praying in a wooded area near his home, God and Jesus Christ appeared to him, told him his sins were forgiven, and said that all contemporary churches had "turned aside from the gospel." Smith said he recounted the experience to a Methodist minister, who dismissed the story "with great contempt". According to historian Steven C. Harper, "There is no evidence in the historical record that Joseph Smith told anyone but the minister of his vision for at least a decade", and Smith might have kept it private because of how uncomfortable that first dismissal was. During the 1830s, Smith overcame this discomfort and orally described the vision to some of his followers, though it was not widely published among Mormons until the 1840s. This first vision later grew in importance to Smith's followers, who eventually regarded it as the first event in the restoration of Christ's church to Earth. Smith himself may have originally considered it a personal conversion.

According to Smith's later accounts, while praying one night in 1823, he was visited by an angel named Moroni. Smith said this angel revealed the location of a buried book made of golden plates, as well as other artifacts, including a breastplate and a set of interpreters composed of two seer stones set in a frame, which had been hidden in a hill near his home. Smith said he attempted to remove the plates the next morning, but was unsuccessful because the angel returned and prevented him. Smith reported that during the next four years, he made annual visits to the hill, but, until the fourth and final visit, each time he returned without the plates.

Meanwhile, the Smith family faced financial hardship, due in part to the death of Smith's oldest brother Alvin, who had assumed a leadership role in the family. Family members supplemented their meager farm income by hiring out for odd jobs and working as treasure seekers, a type of magical supernaturalism common during the period. Smith was said to have an ability to locate lost items by looking into a seer stone, which he also used in treasure hunting, including, beginning in 1825, several unsuccessful attempts to find buried treasure sponsored by Josiah Stowell, a wealthy farmer in Chenango County, New York. In 1826, Smith was brought before a Chenango County court for "glass-looking", or pretending to find lost treasure; Stowell's relatives accused Smith of tricking Stowell and faking an ability to perceive hidden treasure, though Stowell attested that he believed Smith had such abilities. The result of the proceeding remains unclear because primary sources report conflicting outcomes.

While boarding at the Hale house in Harmony, Pennsylvania, Smith met and courted Emma Hale. When Smith proposed marriage, Emma's father, Isaac Hale objected; he believed Smith had no means to support Emma. Hale also considered Smith a stranger who appeared "careless" and "not very well educated." Smith and Emma eloped and married on January 18, 1827, after which the couple began boarding with Smith's parents in Manchester. Later that year, when Smith promised to abandon treasure seeking, Hale offered to let the couple live on his property in Harmony and help Smith get started in business.

Smith made his last visit to the hill shortly after midnight on September 22, 1827, taking Emma with him. This time, he said he successfully retrieved the plates. He said the angel commanded him not to show the plates to anyone else, but to translate them and publish their translation. Smith said the plates were a religious record of Middle-Eastern indigenous Americans and were engraved in an unknown language, called reformed Egyptian. He also told associates that he was capable of reading and translating them.

Although Smith had abandoned treasure hunting, his former associates believed he had double crossed them and had taken the golden plates for himself, property they believed should be jointly shared. After they ransacked places where they believed the plates might be hidden, Smith decided to leave Palmyra.

Founding a church (1827–1830)

In October 1827, Smith and Emma moved from Palmyra to Harmony (now Oakland), Pennsylvania, aided by a relatively prosperous neighbor, Martin Harris. Living near his in-laws, Smith transcribed some characters that he said were engraved on the plates and dictated their translations to Emma.

In February 1828, Harris arrived in Harmony, and he took a sample of the characters Smith had copied to a few prominent scholars, including Charles Anthon. Harris said Anthon initially authenticated the characters and their translation but then retracted his opinion after learning that Smith claimed to have received the plates from an angel. Anthon denied Harris's account of the meeting, claiming instead that he had tried to convince Harris that he was the victim of a fraud. In any event, Harris returned to Harmony in April 1828 and began serving as Smith's scribe.

Although Harris and his wife Lucy were early supporters of Smith, by June 1828, they began to have doubts about the existence of the golden plates. Harris persuaded Smith to let him take 116 pages of manuscript to Palmyra to show a few family members, including his wife. While in Harris's possession, the manuscript—of which there was no other copy—was lost. Smith was devastated by this loss, especially since it came at the same time as he lost his first son, who died shortly after birth. Smith said that as punishment for his having lost the manuscript, the angel returned, took away the plates, and revoked his ability to translate. During this period, Smith briefly attended Methodist meetings with his wife, until a cousin of hers objected to inclusion of a "practicing necromancer" on the Methodist class roll.

Smith said that the angel returned the plates to him in September 1828, and he then dictated some of book to his wife Emma. In April 1829, Smith met Oliver Cowdery, who had also dabbled in folk magic; and with Cowdery as scribe, Smith began a period of "rapid-fire translation". Between April and early June 1829, the two worked full time on the manuscript, then moved to Fayette, New York, where they continued the work at the home of Cowdery's friend, Peter Whitmer. When the narrative described an institutional church and a requirement for baptism, Smith and Cowdery baptized each other. Dictation was completed about July 1, 1829.

Although Smith had previously refused to show the plates to anyone, he told Martin Harris, Oliver Cowdery, and David Whitmer that they would be allowed to see them. These men, known collectively as the Three Witnesses, signed a statement stating that they had been shown the golden plates by an angel, and that the voice of God had confirmed the truth of their translation. Later, a group of Eight Witnesses — composed of male members of the Whitmer and Smith families – issued a statement that they had been shown the golden plates by Smith. According to Smith, the angel Moroni took back the plates once Smith finished using them.

The completed work, titled the Book of Mormon, was published in Palmyra by printer E. B. Grandin and was first advertised for sale on March 26, 1830. Less than two weeks later, on April 6, 1830, Smith and his followers formally organized the Church of Christ, and small branches were established in Manchester, Fayette, and Colesville, New York. The Book of Mormon brought Smith regional notoriety and renewed the hostility of those who remembered the 1826 Chenango County trial. After Cowdery baptized several new church members, the Mormons were threatened with mob violence. Before Smith could confirm the newly baptized, he was arrested and charged with being a "disorderly person." Although he was acquitted, both he and Cowdery fled to Colesville to escape a gathering mob. Smith later claimed that, probably around this time, Peter, James, and John had appeared to him and had ordained him and Cowdery to a higher priesthood.

Smith's authority was undermined when Cowdery, Hiram Page, and other church members also claimed to receive revelations. In response, Smith dictated a revelation which clarified his office as a prophet and an apostle and which stated that only he had the ability to declare doctrine and scripture for the church. Smith then dispatched Cowdery, Peter Whitmer, and others on a mission to proselytize Native Americans. Cowdery was also assigned the task of locating the site of the New Jerusalem.

On their way to Missouri, Cowdery's party passed through northeastern Ohio, where Sidney Rigdon and over a hundred followers of his variety of Campbellite Restorationism converted to Mormonism, more than doubling the size of the church. After Rigdon visited New York, he soon became Smith's primary assistant. With growing opposition in New York, Smith announced a revelation that his followers should gather to Kirtland, Ohio, and there establish themselves as a people and await word from Cowdery's mission.

Life in Ohio (1831–1838)

When Smith moved to Kirtland, Ohio in January 1831, he encountered a religious culture that included enthusiastic demonstrations of spiritual gifts, including fits and trances, rolling on the ground, and speaking in tongues. Rigdon's followers were practicing a form of communalism. Smith brought the Kirtland congregation under his authority and tamed ecstatic outbursts.  Smith had promised church elders that in Kirtland they would receive an endowment of heavenly power, and at the June 1831 general conference, he introduced the greater authority of a High ("Melchizedek") Priesthood to the church hierarchy.

Converts poured into Kirtland. By the summer of 1835, there were fifteen hundred to two thousand Mormons in the vicinity, many expecting Smith to lead them shortly to the Millennial kingdom. Though his mission to the Indians had been a failure, Cowdery and the other missionaries with him were charged with finding a site for "a holy city". They found Jackson County, Missouri. After Smith visited in July 1831, he pronounced the frontier hamlet of Independence the "center place" of Zion. For most of the 1830s, the church was effectively based in Ohio. Smith lived there, though he visited Missouri again in early 1832 to prevent a rebellion of prominent church members who believed the church in Missouri was being neglected. Smith's trip was hastened by a mob of Ohio residents who were incensed over the United Order and Smith's political power. The mob beat Smith and Rigdon unconscious, tarred and feathered them, and left them for dead.

In Jackson County, existing Missouri residents resented the Mormon newcomers for both political and religious reasons. Tension increased until July 1833, when non-Mormons forcibly evicted the Mormons and destroyed their property. Smith advised his followers to bear the violence patiently until after they had been attacked multiple times, after which they could fight back. Armed bands exchanged fire, killing one Mormon and two non-Mormons, and the old settlers forcibly expelled the Mormons from the county.

In response, Smith led a small paramilitary expedition called Zion's Camp, to aid the Missouri Mormons. As a military endeavor, the expedition was a failure. The men were imperfectly organized, suffered from a cholera outbreak, and were severely outnumbered. Smith sent two church representatives to petition Missouri governor Daniel Dunklin for protection and support, but Dunklin declined to aid the Mormons. By the end of June, Smith deescalated the confrontation, sought peace with Jackson County's residents, and disbanded Zion's Camp. Nevertheless, Zion's Camp transformed Mormon leadership because many future church leaders came from among the participants.

After the Camp returned to Ohio, Smith drew heavily from its participants to establish various governing bodies in the church. Smith gave a revelation announcing that in order to redeem Zion, his followers would have to receive an endowment in the Kirtland Temple. In March 1836, at the temple's dedication, many who received the endowment reported seeing visions of angels and engaged in prophesying and speaking in tongues.

In late 1837, a series of internal disputes led to the collapse of the Kirtland Mormon community. Smith was blamed for having promoted a church-sponsored bank that failed. Oliver Cowdery (who by then was Assistant President of the Church) also accused Smith of engaging in a sexual relationship with a teenage servant in his home, Fanny Alger. Building the temple had left the church deeply in debt, and Smith was hounded by creditors. Having heard of a large sum of money supposedly hidden in Salem, Massachusetts, Smith traveled there and announced a revelation that God had "much treasure in this city". After a month, though, he returned to Kirtland empty-handed.

In January 1837, Smith and other church leaders created a joint stock company, called the Kirtland Safety Society Anti-Banking Company, to act as a quasi-bank; the company issued banknotes partly capitalized by real estate. Smith encouraged the Latter Day Saints to buy the notes, in which he invested heavily himself. The bank failed within a month. As a result, Latter Day Saints in Kirtland suffered extreme price volatility and intense pressure from debt collectors. Smith was held responsible for the failure, and there were widespread defections from the church, including many of Smith's closest advisers. After a warrant was issued for Smith's arrest on a charge of banking fraud, Smith and Rigdon fled Kirtland for Missouri in January 1838.

Life in Missouri (1838–39)

By 1838, Smith had abandoned plans to redeem Zion in Jackson County, and after Smith and Rigdon arrived in Missouri, the town of Far West, in Caldwell County, became the new "Zion". In Missouri, the church also took the name "Church of Jesus Christ of Latter Day Saints", and construction began on a new temple. In the weeks and months after Smith and Rigdon arrived at Far West, thousands of Latter Day Saints followed them from Kirtland. Smith encouraged the settlement of land outside Caldwell County, instituting a settlement in Adam-ondi-Ahman, in Daviess County.

During this time, a church council expelled many of the oldest and most prominent leaders of the church, including John Whitmer, David Whitmer, W. W. Phelps, and Oliver Cowdery. Smith explicitly approved of the expulsion of these men, who were known collectively as the "dissenters".

Political and religious differences between old Missourians and newly arriving Mormon settlers provoked tensions between the two groups, much as they had in Jackson County. By this time, Smith's experiences with mob violence led him to believe that his faith's survival required greater militancy against anti-Mormons. Around June 1838, "ultra-loyal" Sampson Avard formed a covert organization called the Danites to intimidate Mormon dissenters and oppose anti-Mormon militia units. Though it is unclear how much Smith knew of the Danites' activities, he clearly approved of those of which he did know. After Rigdon delivered a sermon that implied dissenters had no place in the Mormon community, the Danites forcibly expelled them from the county.

In a speech given at Far West’s Fourth of July celebration, Rigdon declared that Mormons would no longer tolerate persecution by the Missourians and spoke of a "war of extermination" if Mormons were attacked. Smith implicitly endorsed this speech, and many non-Mormons understood it to be a thinly veiled threat. They unleashed a flood of anti-Mormon rhetoric in newspapers and in stump speeches given during the 1838 election campaign.

On August 6, 1838, non-Mormons in Gallatin tried to prevent Mormons from voting, and the election-day scuffles initiated the 1838 Mormon War. Non-Mormon vigilantes raided and burned Mormon farms, while Danites and other Mormons pillaged non-Mormon towns. In the Battle of Crooked River, a group of Mormons attacked the Missouri state militia, mistakenly believing them to be anti-Mormon vigilantes. Governor Lilburn Boggs then ordered that the Mormons be "exterminated or driven from the state". On October 30, a party of Missourians surprised and killed seventeen Mormons in the Haun's Mill massacre.

The following day, the Latter Day Saints surrendered to 2,500 state troops and agreed to forfeit their property and leave the state. Smith was immediately brought before a military court, accused of treason, and sentenced to be executed the next morning, but Alexander Doniphan, who was Smith's former attorney and a brigadier general in the Missouri militia, refused to carry out the order. Smith was then sent to a state court for a preliminary hearing, where several of his former allies testified against him.
Smith and five others, including Rigdon, were charged with treason, and transferred to the jail at Liberty, Missouri, to await trial.

Smith's months in prison with an ill and whining Rigdon strained their relationship.  Meanwhile, Brigham Young - as president of the church's Quorum of the Twelve Apostles, one of the church's governing bodies - rose to prominence when he organized the move of about 14,000 Mormon refugees to Illinois and eastern Iowa.

Smith bore his imprisonment stoically. Understanding that he was effectively on trial before his own people, many of whom considered him a fallen prophet, he wrote a personal defense and an apology for the activities of the Danites. "The keys of the kingdom," he wrote, "have not been taken away from us". Though he directed his followers to collect and publish their stories of persecution, he also urged them to moderate their antagonism toward non-Mormons. On April 6, 1839, after a grand jury hearing in Davis County, Smith and his companions escaped custody, almost certainly with the connivance of the sheriff and guards.

Life in Nauvoo, Illinois (1839–1844)

Many American newspapers criticized Missouri for the Haun's Mill massacre and the state's expulsion of the Latter Day Saints. Illinois then accepted Mormon refugees who gathered along the banks of the Mississippi River, where Smith purchased high-priced, swampy woodland in the hamlet of Commerce. Smith attempted to portray the Latter Day Saints as an oppressed minority and unsuccessfully petitioned the federal government for help in obtaining reparations. During the summer of 1839, while Latter Day Saints in Nauvoo suffered from a malaria epidemic, Smith sent Brigham Young and other apostles to missions in Europe, where they made numerous converts, many of them poor factory workers.

Smith also attracted a few wealthy and influential converts, including John C. Bennett, the Illinois quartermaster general. Bennett used his connections in the Illinois legislature to obtain an unusually liberal charter for the new city, which Smith renamed "Nauvoo" (Hebrew נָאווּ, meaning "to be beautiful"). The charter granted the city virtual autonomy, authorized a university, and granted Nauvoo habeas corpus power—which allowed Smith to fend off extradition to Missouri. Though Mormon authorities controlled Nauvoo's civil government, the city guaranteed religious freedom for its residents. The charter also authorized the Nauvoo Legion, a militia whose actions were limited only by state and federal constitutions. Smith and Bennett became its commanders, and were styled Lieutenant General and Major General respectively. As such, they controlled by far the largest body of armed men in Illinois. Smith made Bennett Assistant President of the church, and Bennett was elected Nauvoo's first mayor.

The early Nauvoo years were a period of doctrinal innovation. Smith introduced baptism for the dead in 1840, and in 1841, construction began on the Nauvoo Temple as a place for recovering lost ancient knowledge. An 1841 revelation promised the restoration of the "fullness of the priesthood"; and in May 1842, Smith inaugurated a revised endowment or "first anointing". The endowment resembled the rites of freemasonry that Smith had observed two months earlier when he had been initiated "at sight" into the Nauvoo Masonic lodge. At first, the endowment was open only to men, who were initiated into a special group called the Anointed Quorum. For women, Smith introduced the Relief Society, a service club and sorority within which Smith predicted women would receive "the keys of the kingdom". Smith also elaborated on his plan for a millennial kingdom. No longer envisioning the building of Zion in Nauvoo, Smith viewed Zion as encompassing all of North and South America, with Mormon settlements being "stakes" of Zion's metaphorical tent. Zion also became less a refuge from an impending tribulation than a great building project. In the summer of 1842, Smith revealed a plan to establish the millennial Kingdom of God, which would eventually establish theocratic rule over the whole Earth.

Smith also began secretly marrying additional wives, a practice called plural marriage. He introduced the doctrine to a few of his closest associates, including John Bennett, who used it as an excuse to seduce numerous women, wed and unwed. When rumors of polygamy (called "spiritual wifery" by Bennett) got abroad, Smith forced Bennett's resignation as Nauvoo mayor. In retaliation, Bennett left Nauvoo and began publishing sensational accusations against Smith and his followers.

By mid-1842, popular opinion had turned against the Mormons. After an unknown assailant shot and wounded Missouri governor Lilburn Boggs in May 1842, anti-Mormons circulated rumors that Smith's bodyguard, Porter Rockwell, was the shooter. Though the evidence was circumstantial, Boggs ordered Smith's extradition. Certain he would be killed if he ever returned to Missouri, Smith went into hiding twice during the next five months, before the U.S. district attorney for Illinois argued that Smith's extradition to Missouri would be unconstitutional. (Rockwell was later tried and acquitted.) In June 1843, enemies of Smith convinced a reluctant Illinois Governor Thomas Ford to extradite Smith to Missouri on an old charge of treason. Two law officers arrested Smith, but were intercepted by a party of Mormons before they could reach Missouri. Smith was then released on a writ of habeas corpus from the Nauvoo municipal court. While this ended the Missourians' attempts at extradition, it caused significant political fallout in Illinois.

In December 1843, Smith petitioned Congress to make Nauvoo an independent territory with the right to call out federal troops in its defense. Smith then wrote to the leading presidential candidates, asking what they would do to protect the Mormons. After receiving noncommittal or negative responses, Smith announced his own independent candidacy for President of the United States, suspended regular proselytizing, and sent out the Quorum of the Twelve and hundreds of other political missionaries. In March 1844 – following a dispute with a federal bureaucrat – Smith organized the secret Council of Fifty. Smith said the Council had authority to decide which national or state laws Mormons should obey. The Council was also to select a site for a large Mormon settlement in Texas, California, or Oregon, where Mormons could live under theocratic law beyond other governmental control.

Death

By early 1844, a rift developed between Smith and a half dozen of his closest associates. Most notably, William Law, Smith's trusted counselor, and Robert Foster, a general of the Nauvoo Legion, disagreed with Smith about how to manage Nauvoo's economy. Both also said that Smith had proposed marriage to their wives. Believing these men were plotting against his life, Smith excommunicated them on April 18, 1844. They formed a competing "reform church", and in the following month, at the county seat in Carthage, they procured indictments against Smith for perjury (as Smith publicly denied having more than one wife) and polygamy.

On June 7, the dissidents published the first (and only) issue of the Nauvoo Expositor, calling for reform within the church but also appealing politically to non-Mormons. The paper decried Smith's new "doctrines of many Gods", alluded to Smith's theocratic aspirations, and called for a repeal of the Nauvoo city charter. It also attacked Smith's practice of polygamy, implying that Smith was using religion as a pretext to draw unassuming women to Nauvoo to seduce and marry them.

Fearing the newspaper would provoke a new round of violence against the Mormons, the Nauvoo city council declared the Expositor a public nuisance and ordered the Nauvoo Legion to destroy the press. During the council debate, Smith vigorously urged the council to order the press destroyed, not realizing that destroying a newspaper was more likely to incite an attack than any of the Expositor accusations.

Destruction of the newspaper provoked a strident call to arms from Thomas C. Sharp, editor of the Warsaw Signal and longtime critic of Smith. Fearing mob violence, Smith mobilized the Nauvoo Legion on June 18 and declared martial law. Officials in Carthage responded by mobilizing a small detachment of the state militia, and Governor Thomas Ford intervened, threatening to raise a larger militia unless Smith and the Nauvoo city council surrendered themselves. Smith initially fled across the Mississippi River, but shortly returned and surrendered to Ford. On June 25, Smith and his brother Hyrum arrived in Carthage to stand trial for inciting a riot. Once the Smiths were in custody, the charges were increased to treason, preventing them from posting bail. John Taylor and Willard Richards voluntarily accompanied the Smiths in Carthage Jail.

On June 27, 1844, an armed mob with blackened faces stormed Carthage Jail where Joseph and Hyrum were held. Hyrum, who was trying to secure the door, was killed instantly with a shot to the face. Smith fired three shots from a pepper-box pistol that his friend, Cyrus Wheelock, had lent him, wounding three men, before he sprang for the window. He was shot multiple times before falling out the window, crying, "Oh Lord my God!" He died shortly after hitting the ground, but was shot several more times before the mob dispersed. Five men were tried for Smith's murder, but all were acquitted.

Following his death, non-Mormon newspapers were nearly unanimous in portraying Smith as a religious fanatic. Conversely, within Mormonism, Smith was viewed as a prophet, martyred to seal the testimony of his faith.

After a public funeral and viewing of the deceased Smith brothers, Emma Smith – who feared hostile non-Mormons might try to desecrate the bodies – had their remains buried at night in a secret location with a substitute coffins filled with sand interred in the publicly attested grave. The bodies were later moved and reburied under an outbuilding on the Smith property off the Mississippi River. Members of the Reorganized Church of Jesus Christ of Latter Day Saints (RLDS Church), under the direction of then-RLDS Church president Frederick M. Smith (Joseph Smith's grandson) searched for, located, and disinterred the Smith brothers' remains in 1928 and reinterred them, along with Emma Smith, in Nauvoo at the Smith Family Cemetery.

Legacy

Impact and assessment
Smith attracted thousands of devoted followers before his death in 1844, and millions in the century that followed. Among Mormons, he is regarded as a prophet on par with Moses and Elijah. In a 2015 compilation of the 100 Most Significant Americans of All Time, Smithsonian magazine ranked Smith first in the category of religious figures.

Assessments of Smith in the nineteenth century were typically dismissive, such as that of Philip Schaff, whose 1855 America: A Sketch of Its Political, Social, and Religious Character called Smith an "uneducated but cunning Yankee" and believed the growth of the Latter Day Saint movement an embarrassment for America. Naturalistic biographers in the early twentieth century suggested that Smith suffered from epileptic seizures or from psychological disorders, such as migraines, hallucinations, and "melancholic depression" that might explain his visions and revelations. Fawn Brodie's 1945 biography No Man Knows My History rejected delusive experience as an explanation for Smith's behavior and instead cast him as an intentional charlatan, albeit a talented and accomplished one. After academic Mormon studies developed in the latter half of the twentieth century, two conflicting characterizations of Smith emerged: a fraud preying on the ignorance and credulity of his followers on the one hand (a view associated with detractors of Smith), and a man of God and of great character on the other (the view advanced typically by believers). Historian Jan Shipps called this "the prophet puzzle".

In the twenty-first century, academic assessments became less dismissive of Smith, and scholars became generally more interested in understanding Smith's experiences and his influence in the history of the United States and of religious thought. Biographers – Mormon and non-Mormon alike – agree that Smith was one of the most influential, charismatic, and innovative figures in American religious history. For instance, Wayne Hudson, a humanities scholar, considers Smith "a genuine prophet of world historical importance". Theologian and anthropologist Douglas J. Davies characterizes Smith as a person of striking "moral energy" and courage. According to historian Laurie Maffly-Kipp, Richard Bushman's 2005 Joseph Smith: Rough Stone Rolling – a biography which "steers a deliberate middle ground" between hagiography and exposé – is "the definitive account" of Smith's life. Rough Stone Rolling discusses Smith's financial reversals, mercurial temper, and run-ins with the law, while also making a case that Smith's theology and ecclesiology were coherent and appealing.

Historian John G. Turner noted that outside academia, non-Mormons in the United States generally consider Smith a "charlatan, scoundrel, and heretic", while outside the United States, he is "obscure". Smith's legacy within the Latter Day Saint movement varies between denominations. The Church of Jesus Christ of Latter-day Saints (LDS Church) and its members consider Smith the founding prophet of their church. In the words of LDS apostle D. Todd Christofferson, Latter-day Saints "readily acknowledge" Smith's "continuing influence for good in the world, the revelations that he brought forth, his example of service and sacrifice, and his devotion to and witness of the living God". Meanwhile, Smith's reputation in the Community of Christ is ambivalent. The Community of Christ never accepted Smith's Nauvoo-era theological innovations, and late-twentieth-century theological changes further separated the denomination's self-identity from Smith. Community of Christ continues "honoring his role" in the church's founding history but deemphasizes human leadership, including that of Smith, in favor of "greater focus on Jesus Christ." Woolleyite Mormon fundamentalism has deified Smith within a cosmology of many gods. 

Memorials to Smith include the Joseph Smith Memorial Building in Salt Lake City, Utah, the former Joseph Smith Memorial building on the campus of Brigham Young University as well as the current Joseph Smith Building there, a granite obelisk marking Smith's birthplace, and a fifteen-foot-tall bronze statue of him in the World Peace Dome in Pune, India.

Successors and denominations

Smith's death resulted in a succession crisis. Smith had proposed several ways to choose his successor, but never clarified his preference. Smith's brother Hyrum, had he survived, would have had the strongest claim, followed by Smith's brother Samuel, who died abruptly a month after Joseph and Hyrum. Another brother, William, was unable to attract a sufficient following. Smith's sons Joseph III and David were too young: Joseph was 11, and David was born after Smith's death. The Council of Fifty had a theoretical claim to succession, but it was a secret organization. Two of Smith's chosen successors, Oliver Cowdery and David Whitmer, had already left the church. Emma Smith and some members of the Anointed Quorum supported appointing Nauvoo stake president William Marks as church president, but Marks ultimately supported Sidney Rigdon's claim to succession.

The two strongest succession candidates were Brigham Young, senior member and president of the Quorum of the Twelve Apostles, and Sidney Rigdon, the senior remaining member of the First Presidency. In a church-wide conference on August 8, most of the Latter Day Saints present elected Young. They eventually left Nauvoo and settled the Salt Lake Valley. Nominal membership in Young's denomination, named the Church of Jesus Christ of Latter-day Saints (LDS Church), surpassed 16 million in 2018. Smaller groups followed Sidney Rigdon and James J. Strang, who had based his claim on a letter of appointment ostensibly written by Smith but which some scholars believe was forged. Some hundreds followed Lyman Wight to establish a community in Texas. Others followed Alpheus Cutler. Many members of these smaller groups, including most of Smith's family, eventually coalesced in 1860 under the leadership of Joseph Smith III and formed the Reorganized Church of Jesus Christ of Latter Day Saints (later renamed the Community of Christ), which now has about 250,000 members.

Family and descendants

The first of Smith's wives, Emma Hale, gave birth to nine children during their marriage, five of whom died before the age of two. The eldest, Alvin (born in 1828), died within hours of birth, as did twins Thaddeus and Louisa (born in 1831). When the twins died, the Smiths adopted another set of twins, Julia Murdock and Joseph Murdock, whose mother had recently died in childbirth; Joseph Murdock Smith died of measles in 1832. In 1841, Don Carlos, who had been born a year earlier, died of malaria, and five months later, in 1842, Emma gave birth to a stillborn son.

Joseph and Emma had five children who lived to maturity: adopted Julia Murdock, Joseph Smith III, Frederick Granger Williams Smith, Alexander Hale Smith, and David Hyrum Smith. Some historians have speculated—based on journal entries and family stories—that Smith fathered children with his plural wives. However, in cases where DNA testing of potential Smith descendants from plural wives has been possible, results have been negative.

After Smith's death, Emma Smith was quickly alienated from Brigham Young and the church leadership. Emma feared and despised Young, and he was suspicious of her desire to preserve the family's assets from inclusion with those of the church. He also disliked her open opposition to plural marriage. Young excluded Emma Smith from ecclesiastical meetings and from social gatherings. When most Latter Day Saints moved west, she stayed in Nauvoo and married a non-Mormon, Major Lewis C. Bidamon. Emma Smith withdrew from religion until 1860, when she affiliated with the Reorganized Church of Jesus Christ of Latter Day Saints, headed by her son, Joseph Smith III. Emma maintained her belief that Smith had been a prophet, and she never repudiated her belief in the authenticity of the Book of Mormon.

Polygamy 

By some accounts, Smith had been teaching a polygamy doctrine as early as 1831, and there is evidence that Smith may have been a polygamist by 1835. Although the church had publicly repudiated polygamy, in 1837 there was a rift between Smith and Oliver Cowdery over the issue. Cowdery suspected Smith had engaged in a relationship with Fanny Alger, who worked in the Smith household as a serving girl. Smith did not deny having a relationship, but he insisted that he had never admitted to adultery. "Presumably," historian Richard Bushman argues, "because he had married Alger" as a plural wife.

In April 1841, Smith secretly wed Louisa Beaman. During the next two-and-a-half years he secretly married or was sealed to about 30 or 40 additional women. Ten of Smith's plural wives were between the ages of fourteen and twenty; others were over fifty. Ten were already married to other men, though some of these polyandrous marriages were contracted with the consent of the first husbands. Evidence for whether or not and to what degree Smith's polygamous marriages involved sex is ambiguous and varies between marriages; between Smith's busy life and keeping the plural marriages secret, private interactions between Smith and his polygamous wives were limited. Some polygamous marriages may have been considered special religious marriages that would not take effect until after death. In any case, during Smith's lifetime, the practice of polygamy was kept secret from both non-Mormons and most members of the church.

Polygamy caused a breach between Smith and his first wife, Emma. Historian Laurel Thatcher Ulrich argues that "Emma vacillated in her support for plural marriage, sometimes acquiescing to Joseph's sealings, sometimes resisting."  Although Emma knew of some of her husband's marriages, she almost certainly did not know the full extent of his polygamous activities. In 1843, Emma temporarily accepted Smith's marriage to four women of her choosing who boarded in the Smith household, but she later regretted her decision and demanded the other wives leave. That July, at his brother Hyrum's encouragement, Joseph dictated a revelation directing Emma to accept plural marriage. Hyrum delivered the message to Emma, but she furiously rejected it. Joseph and Emma were not reconciled over the matter until September 1843, after Emma began participating in temple ceremonies, and after Joseph made other concessions to her. The next year, in March 1844, Emma publicly denounced polygamy as evil and destructive; and though she did not directly disclose his secret practice of plural marriage, she insisted that people should heed only what Smith taught publicly – implicitly challenging Smith's private promulgation of polygamy.

Despite her knowledge of polygamy, Emma Smith publicly denied that her husband had ever taken additional wives. While Joseph Smith was still alive, Emma spoke against polygamy, and she (along with multiple other signatories directly involved in polygamy) signed an 1842 petition denying that Smith or his church endorsed the practice. After Smith's death, Emma continued to deny his polygamy. When Joseph Smith III and Alexander Hale Smith specifically asked about polygamy in an interview with Emma Smith, she stated, "No such thing as polygamy, or spiritual wifery, was taught, publicly or privately, before my husband's death, that I have now, or ever had any knowledge of ... He had no other wife but me; nor did he to my knowledge ever have".

Revelations

According to historian Richard Bushman, the "signal feature" of Smith's life was "his sense of being guided by revelation". Instead of presenting his ideas with logical arguments, Smith dictated authoritative scripture-like "revelations" and let people decide whether to believe, doing so with what Peter Coviello calls "beguiling offhandedness". Smith and his followers treated his revelations as being above teachings or opinions, and Smith acted as though he believed in his revelations as much as his followers. Smith's first recorded revelation was a rebuke chastising Smith for having let Martin Harris lose 116 pages of Book of Mormon manuscript. The revelation was written as if God were talking rather than as a declaration mediated through Smith; subsequent revelations assumed a similar authoritative style, often opening with words such as "Hearken O ye people which profess my name, saith the Lord your God."

Book of Mormon

The Book of Mormon has been called the longest and most complex of Smith's revelations. Its language resembles the King James Version of the Bible. It is organized as a compilation of smaller books, each named after prominent figures in the narrative; its organization thereby resembles that of the Bible. Unlike the Bible, however, the compilation is integrated as a "uniform whole". It tells the story of the rise and fall of a religious civilization beginning about 600 BC and ending in the fifth century. The story begins with a family that leaves Jerusalem, just before the Babylonian captivity. They eventually construct a ship and sail to a "promised land" in the Western Hemisphere. There, they eventually divide into two factions: Nephites and Lamanites. The Nephites become a righteous people who build a temple and live the law of Moses, though their prophets teach a Christian gospel. The book explains itself to be largely the work of Mormon, a Nephite prophet and military figure. The book closes when Mormon's son, Moroni, finishes engraving and buries the records written on the golden plates.

Christian themes permeate the work; for instance, Nephite prophets in the Book of Mormon teach of Christ's coming and talk of the star that will appear at his birth. After the crucifixion and resurrection in Jerusalem, Jesus appears in the Americas, repeats the Sermon on the Mount, blesses children, and appoints twelve disciples. The book ends with Moroni's exhortation to "come unto Christ".

Early Mormons regarded the Book of Mormon as a companion to the Bible and a religious history of the indigenous peoples of the Americas. Parley P. Pratt said the book "filled my soul with joy and gladness", and he "esteemed the Book, or the information contained in it, more than all the riches of the world". Other readers regarded the book as the work of a fanatic or fraud and thought it was derivative of Smith's surroundings. Alexander Campbell accused Smith of writing "in his Book of Mormon, every error and almost every truth discussed in New York for the last ten years."

Some scholars have considered the Book of Mormon a response to pressing cultural and environmental issues in Smith's day. Historian Dan Vogel regards the book as autobiographical in nature, reflecting Smith's life and perceptions. Biographer Robert V. Remini calls the Book of Mormon "a typically American story" that "radiates the revivalist passion of the Second Great Awakening." Brodie suggested that Smith composed the Book of Mormon by drawing on sources of information available to him, such as the 1823 book View of the Hebrews. Other scholars argue the Book of Mormon is more biblical in inspiration than American. Richard Bushman writes that "the Book of Mormon is not a conventional American book" and that its "innermost structure" better resembles the Bible. According to historian Daniel Walker Howe, the book's "dominant themes are biblical, prophetic, and patriarchal, not democratic or optimistic" like the prevailing American culture. Jan Shipps argues that the Book of Mormon's "complex set of religious claims" provided "the basis of a new mythos" or "story" which early converts accepted and lived in as their world, thus departing from "the early national period in America into a new dispensation of the fulness of times".

Smith never fully described how he produced the Book of Mormon, saying only that he translated by the power of God and implying that he had read its words. The Book of Mormon itself states only that its text will "come forth by the gift and power of God unto the interpretation thereof". Accordingly, there is considerable disagreement about the actual method used. For at least some of the earliest dictation, Smith's compatriots said he used the "Urim and Thummim", a pair of seer stones he said were buried with the plates. However, people close to Smith said that later in the process of dictation, he used a chocolate-colored stone he had found in 1822 that he had used previously for treasure hunting. Joseph Knight said that Smith saw the words of the translation while, after excluding all light, he gazed at the stone or stones in the bottom of his hat, a process similar to divining the location of treasure. Sometimes, Smith concealed the process by raising a curtain or dictating from another room; at other times he dictated in full view of witnesses while the plates lay covered on the table or were hidden elsewhere. After completing the translation, Smith gave the brown stone to Cowdery, but he continued to receive revelations using another stone until about 1833 when he said he no longer needed it.

The Book of Mormon became influential in the church Smith founded. The book drew some converts to the movement; some adherents incorporated Book of Mormon phrases into their speech and writing; and its depiction of a Christian church provided an early model for the Church of Christ's ecclesiastical organization. To early Mormons, the book verified Smith's claims to prophethood. Smith accepted the world described by the Book of Mormon—one in which people preserved and recovered sacred records—as his own, and he adopted the role it described for him as a prophet, seer, and translator. By early 1831, he was introducing himself as "Joseph the Prophet". Smith voiced and promulgated the revelations with confidence, as if he were an Old Testament prophet, and the language of authority in Smith's revelations appealed to converts.

Bible revision

In June 1830, Smith dictated a revelation in which Moses narrates a vision in which he sees "worlds without number" and speaks with God about the purpose of creation and the relation of humankind to deity. This revelation initiated a revision of the Bible which Smith worked on sporadically until 1833 but which remained unpublished until after his death. Smith expressed to his followers that this "new translation" of the Bible would be published "as soon the Lord permit." He may have considered it complete, though according to Emma Smith, the biblical revision was still unfinished when Joseph died.

In the course of producing the Book of Mormon, Smith declared that the Bible was missing "the most plain and precious parts of the gospel". He said his "new translation" of the Bible – produced not by directly translating from manuscripts in another language but by amending and appending to a King James Bible in a process which he and Latter Day Saints believed was guided by inspiration – would correct the lacuna and restore what the contemporary Bible was missing. While many changes involved straightening out seeming contradictions or making small clarifications, other changes added large interpolations to the text. For example, Smith's revision nearly tripled the length of the first five chapters of Genesis into a text called the Book of Moses.

Book of Moses 
The Book of Moses begins with Moses speaking with God "face to face" and seeing a vision of all existence. Moses at first is overwhelmed by the immensity of the cosmos and humanity's smallness in comparison, but God then explains that he made the earth and heavens to bring humans to eternal life. The book subsequently provides an enlarged account of the Genesis creation narrative which describes God having a corporeal body, followed by a rendering of the fall of Adam and Eve in celebratory terms which emphasize eating the forbidden fruit as part of a process of gaining knowledge and becoming more like God. The Book of Moses also expands the story of Enoch, described in the Bible as being an ancestor of Noah. In the expanded narrative, Enoch has a theophany in which he discovers that God is capable of sorrow and weeping and that human sin and suffering cause him to grieve. Enoch then receives a prophetic calling, and he eventually builds a city of Zion so righteous that it is taken to heaven. Enoch's example inspired Smith's own hopes to establish the nascent Church of Christ as a Zion community. The book also elaborates some passages that (to Christians) foreshadowed the coming of Christ, into explicit Christian knowledge of and faith in Jesus as a Savior - in effect Christianizing the Old Testament.

Book of Abraham

In 1835, Smith encouraged some Latter Day Saints in Kirtland to purchase rolls of ancient Egyptian papyri from a traveling exhibitor. Smith said they contained the writings of the ancient patriarchs Abraham and Joseph. Over the next several years, Smith dictated to scribes what he reported was a revelatory translation of one of these rolls, which was published in 1842 as the Book of Abraham. The Book of Abraham speaks of the founding of the Abrahamic nation, astronomy, cosmology, lineage and priesthood, and gives another account of the creation story. 

The papyri associated with the Book of Abraham were thought to have been lost in the Great Chicago Fire, but several fragments were rediscovered in the 1960s.  Egyptologists determined them to be part of the Egyptian Book of Breathing with no connection to Abraham.

Other revelations

According to Parley P. Pratt, Smith dictated his revelations, which were recorded by a scribe without revisions or corrections. Revelations were immediately copied, and then circulated among church members. Smith's revelations often came in response to specific questions. He described the revelatory process as having "pure Intelligence" flowing into him. Smith, however, never viewed the wording to be infallible. The revelations were not God's words verbatim, but "couched in language suitable to Joseph's time". In 1833, Smith edited and expanded many of the previous revelations, publishing them as the Book of Commandments, which later became part of the Doctrine and Covenants.

Smith gave varying types of revelations. Some were temporal, while others were spiritual or doctrinal. Some were received for a specific individual, while others were directed at the whole church. An 1831 revelation called "The Law" contained directions for missionary work, rules for organizing society in Zion, a reiteration of the Ten Commandments, an injunction to "administer to the poor and needy", and an outline for the law of consecration. An 1832 revelation called "The Vision" added to the fundamentals of sin and atonement, and introduced doctrines of life after salvation, exaltation, and a heaven with degrees of glory. Another 1832 revelation was the first to explain priesthood doctrine. Three months later, Smith gave a lengthy revelation called the "Olive Leaf" that discussed subjects such as light, truth, intelligence, and sanctification. A related revelation, given in 1833, put Christ at the center of salvation.

Also in 1833, at a time of temperance agitation, Smith delivered a revelation called the "Word of Wisdom", which counseled a diet of wholesome herbs, fruits, grains, and a sparing use of meat. It also recommended that Latter Day Saints avoid "strong" alcoholic drinks, tobacco, and "hot drinks" (later interpreted to mean tea and coffee). The Word of Wisdom was originally framed as a recommendation rather than a commandment and was not strictly followed by Smith and other early Latter Day Saints, though it later became a requirement in the LDS Church. In 1835, Smith gave the "great revelation" that organized the priesthood into quorums and councils, and functioned as a complex blueprint for church structure. Smith's last revelation, on the "New and Everlasting Covenant", was recorded in 1843, and dealt with the theology of family, the doctrine of sealing, and plural marriage.

Before 1832, most of Smith's revelations concerned establishing the church, gathering followers, and building the City of Zion. Later revelations dealt primarily with the priesthood, endowment, and exaltation. The pace of formal revelations slowed during the autumn of 1833 and again after the dedication of the Kirtland Temple. Smith moved away from formal written revelations spoken in God's voice, and instead taught more in sermons, conversations, and letters. For instance, the doctrines of baptism for the dead and the nature of God were introduced in sermons, and one of Smith's most famed statements, about there being "no such thing as immaterial matter", was recorded from a casual conversation with a Methodist preacher.

Views and teachings

Cosmology and theology

Smith taught that all existence was material, including a world of "spirit matter" so fine that it was invisible to all but the purest mortal eyes. Matter, in Smith's view, could be neither created nor destroyed; the creation involved only the reorganization of existing matter. Like matter, Smith saw "intelligence" as co-eternal with God, and he taught that human spirits had been drawn from a pre-existent pool of eternal intelligences. Nevertheless, according to Smith, spirits could not experience a "fullness of joy" unless joined with corporeal bodies. Therefore, the work and glory of God was to create worlds across the cosmos where inferior intelligences could be embodied.

Historians have debated about Smith's early conception of God. According to Dan Vogel and Thomas Alexander, in the early-to-mid-1830s Smith viewed God the Father as a spirit. However, Terryl Givens and Brian Hauglid argue that although Smith sometimes spoke of God using trinitarian language, revelations he dictated as early as 1830 described God as an embodied being. Catholic philosopher Stephen H. Webb describes Smith having had a "corporeal and anthropomorphic understanding of God" evinced in his 1830 Book of Moses that described God as a physical being who literally resembles human beings. Steven C. Harper states that because, in the 1830s, Smith privately described to some of his followers his 1820 first vision as a theophany of "two divine, corporeal beings," "its implications for the trinity and materiality of God were asserted that early".

Over time, Smith widely and clearly articulated a belief that God was an advanced and glorified man, embodied within time and space. By 1841, he publicly taught that God the Father and Jesus were distinct beings with physical bodies. Nevertheless, he conceived of the Holy Spirit as a "personage of Spirit". Smith extended this materialist conception to all existence and taught that "all spirit is matter", meaning that a person's embodiment in flesh was not a sign of fallen carnality, but a divine quality that humans shared with deity. Humans are, therefore, not so much God's creations as they are God's "kin". There is also considerable evidence that Smith taught, at least to limited audiences, that God the Father was accompanied by God the Mother. In this conception, God fully understood is plural, embodied, gendered, and both male and female.

Through the gradual acquisition of knowledge, according to Smith, those who received exaltation could eventually become like God. These teachings implied a vast hierarchy of gods, with God himself having a father. In Smith's cosmology, those who became gods would reign, unified in purpose and will, leading spirits of lesser capacity to share immortality and eternal life.

In Smith's view, the opportunity to achieve exaltation extended to all humanity. Those who died with no opportunity to accept saving ordinances could achieve exaltation by accepting them in the afterlife through proxy ordinances performed on their behalf. Smith said that children who died in their innocence would be guaranteed to rise at the resurrection and receive exaltation. Apart from those who committed the eternal sin, Smith taught that even the wicked and disbelieving would achieve a degree of glory in the afterlife.

Religious authority and ritual

Smith's teachings were rooted in dispensational restorationism. He taught that the Church of Christ restored through him was a latter-day restoration of the early Christian faith, which had been lost in the Great Apostasy. At first, Smith's church had little sense of hierarchy, and his religious authority was derived from his visions and revelations. Though Smith did not claim exclusive prophethood, an early revelation designated him as the only prophet allowed to issue commandments "as Moses". This religious authority included economic and political, as well as spiritual, matters. For instance, in the early 1830s, Smith temporarily instituted a form of religious communism, called the United Order, that required Latter Day Saints to give all their property to the church, to be divided among the faithful. He also envisioned that the theocratic institutions he established would have a role in the worldwide political organization of the Millennium.

By the mid-1830s, Smith began teaching a hierarchy of three priesthoods—the Melchizedek, the Aaronic, and the Patriarchal. Each priesthood was a continuation of biblical priesthoods through patrilineal succession or through ordination by biblical figures appearing in visions. Upon introducing the Melchizedek or "High" Priesthood in 1831, Smith taught that its recipients would be "endowed with power from on high", fulfilling a desire for a greater holiness and an authority commensurate with the New Testament apostles. This doctrine of endowment evolved through the 1830s until, in 1842, the Nauvoo endowment included an elaborate ceremony containing elements similar to those of Freemasonry and the Jewish Kabbalah. Although the endowment was extended to women in 1843, Smith never clarified whether women could be ordained to priesthood offices.

Smith taught that the High Priesthood's endowment of heavenly power included the sealing powers of Elijah, allowing High Priests to perform ceremonies with effects that continued after death. For example, this power would enable proxy baptisms for the dead and marriages that would last into eternity. Elijah's sealing powers also enabled the second anointing, or "fulness of the priesthood", which, according to Smith, sealed married couples to their exaltation.

Theology of family
During the early 1840s, Smith unfolded a theology of family relations, called the "New and Everlasting Covenant", that superseded all earthly bonds. He taught that outside the covenant, marriages were simply matters of contract, and that in the afterlife, individuals who were unmarried or who married outside the covenant would be limited in their progression towards Godhood. To fully enter the covenant, a man and woman must participate in a "first anointing", a "sealing" ceremony, and a "second anointing" (also called "sealing by the Holy Spirit of Promise"). When fully sealed into the covenant, Smith said that no sin nor blasphemy (other than murder and apostasy) could keep them from their exaltation in the afterlife. According to a revelation Smith dictated, God appointed only one person on Earth at a time—in this case, Smith—to possess this power of sealing. According to Smith, men and women needed to be sealed to each other in this new and everlasting covenant (also called "celestial marriage") in order to be exalted in heaven after death and that such celestial marriage, perpetuated across generations, could reunite extended families of ancestors and descendants in the afterlife.

Plural marriage, or polygamy, was Smith's "most famous innovation", according to historian Matthew Bowman. Once Smith introduced polygamy, it became part of his refined "Abrahamic project" in which Smith taught that the solution to humanity's chaos was accepting the divine order of the cosmos under God's authority in a "fusion of ecclesiastical and civic authority".

Smith also taught that the highest level of exaltation could be achieved through "plural marriage" (polygamy), the ultimate manifestation of the New and Everlasting Covenant. Plural marriage, according to Smith, allowed an individual to transcend the angelic state and become a god, accelerating the expansion of one's heavenly kingdom. Within Smith's theology of embodied deity and humanity's potential to become gods, polygamy was a means by which practitioners could overcome the overarching Christian tradition that identified the physical body with sin and learn to instead recognize their embodied joy as sacred.

Political views
While campaigning for President of the United States in 1844, Smith had opportunity to take political positions on issues of the day. Smith considered the U.S. Constitution, and especially the Bill of Rights, to be inspired by God and "the [Latter Day] Saints' best and perhaps only defense." He believed a strong central government was crucial to the nation's well-being and thought democracy better than tyranny—although he also taught that a theocratic monarchy was the ideal form of government. In foreign affairs, Smith was an expansionist, though he viewed "expansionism as brotherhood" and envisioned expanding the United States with the permission of indigenous peoples and at the request of other sovereign peoples. In practice, Smith advocated accepting Texas into the Union, claiming the disputed Oregon country, and someday incorporating Canada and Mexico into the United States.

To protect US business and agriculture, Smith favored high tariffs and a publicly-owned central national bank with democratically elected officers that would print currency but "never issue any more bills than the amount of capital stock in her vaults and the interest".

Smith opposed imprisonment for debt or as a criminal penalty (except in the case of murder), recommended abolishing courts-martial for military deserters, and encouraged citizens to petition their state leaders to pardon all convicts. He suggested that courts instead sentence convicts to labor on public works projects, such as road building, and he argued that providing education would make prisons obsolete. He also advocated capital punishment for public officials who failed to aid people whose constitutional rights had been abridged.

Smith declared that he would be one of the instruments in fulfilling Nebuchadnezzar's statue vision in the Book of Daniel: that secular government would be destroyed without bloodshed, and would be replaced with a "theodemocratic" Kingdom of God. Smith taught that this kingdom would be governed by theocratic principles, but that it would also be multi-denominational and democratic, so long as the people chose wisely.

Slavery and race
Smith held differing positions on the issue of slavery. Initially he opposed it, but during the mid-1830s, when the Mormons were settling in Missouri (a slave state), he justified slavery in an anti-abolitionist essay. Then in the early 1840s, after Mormons had been expelled from Missouri, he once again opposed slavery. During his presidential campaign of 1844, he proposed that the federal government end slavery by 1850 by financially compensating enslavers.

However, biographer Donna Hills notes that Smith's "feelings were complex...and cannot be neatly classified as liberal." He did not support black self-government and opposed interracial marriage. Although Smith welcomed black Americans, enslaved and free, into church membership, he instructed his followers not to baptize enslaved people without permission of their enslavers. He once said that black people "came into the world as slaves" but that this was a situational condition of enslavement rather than a permanent characteristic, and that black Americans were as capable of education as white Americans. 

Smith and other early Mormons believed racial division was a temporary estrangement of an initially united human family, and they considered Smith's religious movement a divinely ordained way to restore humanity to its original relationship. However, they envisioned this unity in terms of a "white universalism" in which people of color and indigenous people would assimilate into whiteness and "overcome the legacy of spiritual inferiority of the cursed lineages" into which Smith and his followers believed people of color were born.

See also
 1844 United States presidential election
 Chronology of Mormonism
 History of the Latter Day Saint movement
 List of founders of religious traditions
 Outline of Joseph Smith
 Smith family (Latter Day Saints)

Notes

References

.

 

 

 See Book of Mormon.

 See Doctrine and Covenants.
 See The History of Joseph Smith by His Mother

Works
 "History of the Latter Day Saints," in I. Daniel Rupp (ed.), He Pasa Ekklessia: An Original History of the Religious Denominations at Present Existing in the United States ... , Philadelphia, J.Y. Humphreys, 1844.

External links

 
 
 
 
 Official LDS Church site about Joseph Smith
 JosephSmithPapers.org—An LDS Church project compiling primary documents relating to Joseph Smith
 Recently-discovered photo of Smith

 
1805 births
1844 deaths
19th-century American writers
19th-century apocalypticists
American Freemasons
American Latter Day Saint leaders
American Latter Day Saint missionaries
American city founders
American male writers
American militia generals
American murder victims
American people of English descent
Angelic visionaries
Apostles of the Church of Christ (Latter Day Saints)
Assassinated mayors
Assassinated religious leaders
Book of Mormon witnesses
Burials at the Smith Family Cemetery
Candidates in the 1844 United States presidential election
Deaths by firearm in Illinois
Doctrine and Covenants people
Editors of Latter Day Saint publications
Founders of new religious movements
History of the Latter Day Saint movement
Latter Day Saint martyrs
Latter Day Saint missionaries in Canada
Latter Day Saint missionaries in the United States
Latter Day Saints from Illinois
Latter Day Saints from Missouri
Latter Day Saints from New York (state)
Latter Day Saints from Ohio
Latter Day Saints from Vermont
Lynching deaths in Illinois
Mayors of Nauvoo, Illinois
Mormon mystics
Nauvoo Legion
People from Ontario County, New York
People from Palmyra, New York
People from Windsor County, Vermont
People murdered in Illinois
Male murder victims
Presidents of the Church (LDS Church)
Prophet-Presidents of the Community of Christ
 Smith
Religious leaders from New York (state)
Religious leaders from Vermont
Seership in Mormonism
Smith family (Latter Day Saints)
Tarring and feathering in the United States
Treasure hunters
Victims of religiously motivated violence in the United States